The Cygnet Island, part of the Waterhouse Island Group, is a  granite islet situated in Banks Strait, part of Bass Strait, lying close to the north-eastern coast of Tasmania, Australia.

Other islands in the Waterhouse Group include Ninth, Tenth, Waterhouse, Little Waterhouse, Maclean, Baynes, Foster, Swan, Little Swan, St Helens and Paddys islands and Bird Rock and George Rocks islets.

Fauna

Recorded breeding seabird and wader species are Pacific gull, sooty oystercatcher and black-faced cormorant.

See also

List of islands of Tasmania

References

Islands of North East Tasmania
Waterhouse Island group